William P. Hayes (March 27, 1866 – October 20, 1940) was an American lawyer and  politician who served as the twenty seventh Mayor of Springfield, Massachusetts.

Early life
Hayes was born in Springfield, Massachusetts on March 27, 1866 to John and Margaret Hayes.

Education
Hays was educated at the Springfield grammar and High Schools.  Hayes attended Ottawa College in Ottawa, Ontario, where he spent one year, and Boston University School of Law, from which he graduated in 1889.

Early career
Hayes was the Assistant City Assessor of Springfield in 1887 and 1888.  Hayes was admitted to the Massachusetts Bar at Springfield, Massachusetts on November 12, 1889.  
He was also the first Irish mayor of Springfield, Massachusetts.

See also
 128th Massachusetts General Court (1907)

Notes

1866 births
1940 deaths
Boston University School of Law alumni
Massachusetts lawyers
Mayors of Springfield, Massachusetts
Democratic Party Massachusetts state senators
Springfield, Massachusetts City Council members